Dog Boy (2009) is a novel by Australian author Eva Sallis, writing under the pseudonym Eva Hornung. It won the 2010 Prime Minister's Literary Award for Fiction. It was inspired by the story of feral child Ivan Mishukov.

Plot summary 
Romochka is a feral child, raised by dogs and found on the streets of Moscow in the summer of 1998.  He appears to be six years old and has been with the pack for two years.  This novel examines his life on the streets and the changes he undergoes as he transforms from "dog" to "boy".

Notes 

 Dedication: For Philip Waldron

Reviews 

 The Guardian
 The Telegraph

Awards and nominations 

 2009 shortlisted Victorian Premier's Literary Awards — The Vance Palmer Prize for Fiction 
 2010 shortlisted Australian Literature Society Awards — ALS Gold Medal 
 2010 shortlisted Australian Book Industry Awards (ABIA) — Australian Literary Fiction Book of the Year 
 2010 winner Prime Minister's Literary Awards — Fiction

Translations 

 German: Dog Boy. Translation by Thomas Gunkel. Suhrkamp Verlag 2011. .
 Spanish: El Niño Perro. Editorial Salamandra 2010. .

References

2009 Australian novels
Fictional feral children
Novels set in Moscow